This is a list of the scheduled castes in the Indian state of Rajasthan.

References 

The Constitution (Scheduled Castes) Order, 1950 1 (C.O.19) Part XV
https://web.archive.org/web/20130207163453/http://www.censusindia.gov.in/Tables_Published/SCST/scst_main.html

Scheduled castes
Rajasthan